La bohème (also known as La bohème de Puccini) is a 2008 Austrian-German film of an opera directed by Robert Dornhelm. It is based on Giacomo Puccini's 1896 opera La bohème.

Cast

Reception
CineMagazine rated it 3 stars.

References

External links

2008 films
2000s musical films
Austrian musical films
German musical films
Films directed by Robert Dornhelm
Films based on La bohème
Films based on works by Giuseppe Giacosa
Films set in Paris
Films set in the 19th century
Opera films
2000s German films